Euparius is a genus of fungus weevils in the family Anthribidae. There are at least 6 described species in Euparius.

Species
 Euparius lugubris (Olivier, 1795)
 Euparius marmoreus (Olivier, 1795)
 Euparius paganus Gyllenhal, 1833
 Euparius pictus Valentine, 1972
 Euparius subtesellatus Schaeffer, 1906
 Euparius subtesselatus Schaeffer, 1906

References

 Alonso-Zarazaga, Miguel A., and Christopher H. C. Lyal (1999). A World Catalogue of Families and Genera of Curculionoidea (Insecta: Coleoptera) (Excepting Scotylidae and Platypodidae), 315.
 Poole, Robert W., and Patricia Gentili, eds. (1996). "Coleoptera". Nomina Insecta Nearctica: A Check List of the Insects of North America, vol. 1: Coleoptera, Strepsiptera, 41-820.
 Valentine, Barry D. (1998). "A review of Nearctic and some related Anthribidae (Coleoptera)". Insecta Mundi, vol. 12, no. 3 and 4, 251–296.
 Valentine, Barry D. / Arnett, Ross H. Jr., Michael C. Thomas, P. E. Skelley, and J. H. Frank, eds. (2002). "Family 126. Anthribidae". American Beetles, vol. 2: Polyphaga: Scarabaeoidea through Curculionoidea, 695–700.

Further reading

 Arnett, R. H. Jr., M. C. Thomas, P. E. Skelley and J. H. Frank. (eds.). (21 June 2002). American Beetles, Volume II: Polyphaga: Scarabaeoidea through Curculionoidea. CRC Press LLC, Boca Raton, Florida .
 Arnett, Ross H. (2000). American Insects: A Handbook of the Insects of America North of Mexico. CRC Press.
 Richard E. White. (1983). Peterson Field Guides: Beetles. Houghton Mifflin Company.

External links

 NCBI Taxonomy Browser, Euparius

Anthribidae